"Like a Child" is a song by Jars of Clay. It is the fourth radio single from their self-titled debut album. Like many of the other tracks on the record, the song was written while the band members were students at Greenville College. The band's demo album, Frail, released in 1994, contains the first known recording of the song. The song was re-recorded in 1995 for the band's debut album; however only a few differences exist between the two recordings. A live version of the song appears on the band's 2003 double album, Furthermore: From the Studio, From the Stage.

External links
 Song review at Jesusfreakhideout
 Song's reference to The Bible's Mark 10:15

1996 singles
Jars of Clay songs
1995 songs
Essential Records (Christian) singles
Songs written by Dan Haseltine
Songs written by Charlie Lowell
Songs written by Stephen Mason (musician)
Songs written by Matt Bronleewe